Enrique "Quique" Neira Leiva (born April 11, 1973) is a Chilean reggae singer and composer. He was the lead vocalist of the band Gondwana and is currently a solo artist. He is the most recognized icon of the reggae en español movement in Chile.

Awards 
 Award for Musical Arts Altazor 2006, category Best Pop Ballad for good things.
 APES Award 2006, Best Composer category.
 Recently elected as a board member of the SCD.

Discography

In Bambu 
 Bambu (1995)
 No necesitamos Banderas (1996)

In Gondwana 
 Gondwana (1997)
 RAS Portraits: Gondwana (1998)
 Phat Cherimoya Dub (1999)
 Together (1999)
 Praise (For the Strength of Reason) (2000)
 Made in Jamaica (2002)

Solo 
 Eleven (2003)
 Cosas Buenas (2005)
 Jah Rock (2007) Edition Europe 2010;
 Jah Dub (2010)
 Alma (2011)
 Un Amor (2014)
 La Vida Es Una Canción Vol.1 (2017)
 Cover Me (EP) (2018)
 La Vida Es Una Canción II (2019)

Awards 
 Altazor Award for Musical Arts 2006, category Best Pop Ballad for good things.
 APES Award 2006, Best Composer category.
 Recently elected as a board member of the SCD.

References

External links 
 Quique Neira on Sonicbids

Chilean male singers
1973 births
Living people